Dirty Mountain is a summit in Albany County, Wyoming, in the United States.

References

Mountains of Albany County, Wyoming
Mountains of Wyoming